Santos–Imigrantes is a station on Line 2 (Green) of the São Paulo Metro.

Station layout

SPTrans Lines
The following SPTrans bus lines can be accessed. Passengers may use a Bilhete Único card for transfer:

References

São Paulo Metro stations